A lightweight blockchain is a modified, "stripped-back" blockchain enabling trustless, secure data transactions between nodes. A blockchain is a distributed ledger with growing lists of records (blocks) that are securely linked together via cryptographic hashes. To ensure each new block of data added to the chain is legitimate, a consensus mechanism must be used; for example, the Bitcoin blockchain utilizes Proof-of-Work (PoW) and the Ethereum blockchain utilizes Proof-of-Stake (PoS). The architecture of this blockchain-based distributed ledger technology requires intensive energy consumption and computational power, which not all devices can support.

Though lightweight blockchains are simplified, they do not sacrifice on data security, making them suitable for applications and devices that need data reliability but limited computational resources. For example, Internet of Things (IoT) devices or Autonomous Vehicles. 

Lightweight blockchain-based devices can have various use-cases. A recent experiment proved that a lightweight blockchain-based network could accommodate up to 1.34 million authentication processes every second, which is more than sufficient to be applied in a resource-constrained IoT network  and even in the health sector.

References 

Blockchains